The Ven. Andrew William Doughty, BD,  AKC (born 1956) is an Anglican priest; he is the current Archdeacon of Bermuda.

He was educated at King's College London and Westcott House, Cambridge;  and ordained in 1983.  After a curacy in Alton he held incumbencies in Basingstoke, North Baddesley and Warwick Parish, Bermuda before his appointment as Archdeacon.

References

1956 births
Living people
Alumni of King's College London
Associates of King's College London
Alumni of Westcott House, Cambridge
20th-century Anglican priests
21st-century Anglican priests
Archdeacons of Bermuda